Yoka Berretty (8 May 1928 – 28 November 2015) was a Dutch actress. She appeared in more than 30 films and television shows between 1954 and 2000.

Selected filmography
 The Band of Honest Men (1956)
 Makkers Staakt uw Wild Geraas (1960)
 The Silent Raid (1962)
 Charlotte (1981)
 Punk Lawyer (1996)

References

External links

1928 births
2015 deaths
Dutch film actresses
Actors from Rotterdam
20th-century Dutch actresses